Frank Jonasson (December 14, 1878 – October 17, 1942) was an American film actor of the silent era.  He appeared in 75 films between 1914 and 1930. He was born in Salt Lake City, Utah, and died in Rancho Los Amigos, California.

Selected filmography
 Stingaree (1915)
 The Social Pirates (1916)
 The Man from Tia Juana (1917)
 The Midnight Man (1919)
 Riders of the Law (1922)
 The Fighting Coward (1924)
 The Top of the World (1925)
 The Movies (1925)
 Old Ironsides (1926)
 Cock o' the Walk (1930)
 The Big Fight (1930)

References

External links

1878 births
1942 deaths
American male film actors
American male silent film actors
Male actors from Salt Lake City
20th-century American male actors